Christiane Ziegler (born May 3, 1942, in L'Isle-sur-la-Sorgue), is a French Egyptologist, curator, director emeritus of the Department of Egyptian Antiquities of the Louvre Museum and editorial director of the archaeological mission from the Louvre Museum at Saqqara, Egypt.

Early years
Ziegler was a student at the Institut de Science Politique. Studying under the direction of Professor Nicolas Grimal, she is a graduate of Paris-Sorbonne University. She began studying Egyptology with a thesis on the Queen Tiye, wife of Amenhotep III. Ziegler's internship was at the Louvre's Department of Oriental Antiquities.

Career
Ziegler started her career as a high school teacher. She began working at the Louvre in 1972 and her archaeological research at Saqqara began in 1991. She is the author of numerous important scientific articles and books about Egyptology.  She has also authored translations of ancient letters from Egypt and Nubia as well as several books on History of Egyptian Art. 

In particular, she has studied the monuments of the time of the pyramids of Ancient Egypt (hieroglyphic inscriptions, statues, paintings and reliefs of the tombs), the various components of the site of Saqqara, metal arts from the Pharaonic period (bronze and silver) and has written a monograph devoted to Queen Tiye, wife of Amenhotep III. A long-time Egyptian archaeology professor at the Ecole du Louvre, Christiane Ziegler also co-directs the department of Egyptian Archaeology.

Since 1991, she has headed the archaeological mission from the Louvre Museum at Saqqara on the "North of the Unas Causeway" under the Supreme Council of Antiquities. In 1993, she was named chief curator of the Louvre's Department of Antiquities. During the period 1994–2004, she was director of the Research Unit Louvre, whose work focuses on the Theban region. While her mission's initial purpose was to locate the mastaba of Akhethetep, it also located two other Old Kingdom mastabas, many burials dating to the Twenty-sixth through Thirtieth dynasties, as well as Coptic settlements. During which time she excavated and wrote a book on the Tomb of Akhethetep, paying particular attention to its reliefs. A team led by Ziegler was responsible for finding hundreds of mummies in an underground maze of caves, most likely an ancient multifamily cemetery, crammed into shafts and corridors at Saqqara.

Ziegler has curated major exhibitions, notably "Origins of Writing" (Grand Palais, 1982) "Tanis, the gold of the Pharaohs" (Paris-Grand Palais Edinburgh, 1987–1988), "Memoirs of Egypt" (Paris-Berlin, 1990), "Egyptomania" (Paris, Ottawa and Vienna, 1994–1996), and "Egyptian Art in the Age of the Pyramids" (Paris-New York-Toronto, 1999–2000).  For her exhibition "The Pharaohs" (Venice-Paris-Madrid-Bahrain-Valencia, 2002–2007), Ziegler curated 300 masterpieces of ancient Egypt, brought together for the first time, to be viewed from two perspectives; on the one hand being powerful, monumental images, as they are best known, and, secondly, as the human person who recognized himself as a divine intermediary. The display in the National Museum of Bahrain, which featured 120 objects, was designed by Cairo-based architect Agnieszka Dobrowolska. According to Ziegler, the  2008 "Queens of Egypt" (July–September 2008, Grimaldi Forum, Monaco) exhibition is the first to be devoted entirely to Egypt's queens while also being unique in the number and quality of the assembled pieces from some of the world's greatest museums. She is preparing an international exhibition at the site of Saqqara, planned for 2011–2012.

Ziegler is a member of numerous learned societies.  These include the International Committee of UNESCO for the new museums in Aswan and Cairo, the Scientific Council of the Institut Français d'Archéologie Orientale, the commission on excavations of the Department of Foreign Affairs of the German Archaeological Institute, and Vice President of Friends of Museums in Egypt.  She sits on the scientific board of Agence France-Muséums in charge of the program Louvre Abu Dhabi, and participates on the board of the National Museum of History and Art.

Awards
Ziegler is a recipient of the Gaston Maspero Lifetime Achievement Award  awarded by the Académie des Inscriptions et Belles-Lettres. She is a 2008 recipient of the prestigious Légion d'honneur and Commandeur de l'Ordre national du Mérite awards.

Selected publications
 With Hervé Champollion et  Diane Harlé, L'Égypte de Jean-François Champollion – Lettres et journaux de voyage aux éditions Jean Paul Mengès – 1989
 With Christophe Barbotin et Marie-Hélène Rutschowscaya, Le Louvre : les antiquités égyptiennes, Le Louvre aux éditions Scala – 1990
 Le mastaba d'Akhethetep : Une chapelle funéraire de l'Ancien Empire, aux éditions de la Réunion des Musées Nationaux – 1993
 With Jean-Marcel Humbert et Michael Pantazzi, Égyptomania : L'Égypte dans l'art occidental, 1730–1930, aux éditions Réunion des Musées Nationaux – 1994
 With Guillemette Andreu, Marie-Hélène Rutschowscaya, L'Égypte ancienne au Louvre, aux éditions Hachette Littérature – 1997
 La mission archéologique du Louvre à Saqqara. Dernières découvertes dans Comptes-rendus de l'Académie des Inscriptions et Belles-Lettres – 1997
 Les statues égyptiennes de l'Ancien Empire, dans la collection des Catalogues du Louvre aux éditions Réunion des Musées Nationaux – 1997
 L'art de l'Ancien Empire égyptien : Actes du colloque organisé au musée du Louvre par le Service culturel les 3 et 4 avril 1998, aux éditions La Documentation Française – 1999
 With Jean-Pierre Adam, Les pyramides d'Égypte,  aux éditions Hachette Littérature – 1999
 With Jean-Luc Bovot, Art et archéologie : L'Égypte ancienne, dans la collection Manuel du Louvre aux éditions Réunion des Musées Nationaux – 2001
 Les Pharaons, aux éditions Flammarion – 2002
 Le Scribe "accroupi", aux éditions Réunion des Musées Nationaux – 2002
 With Annie Gasse, Les stèles d'Horus sur les crocodiles, aux éditions Réunion des Musées Nationaux – 2004
 With Jean-Luc Bovot, L'art égyptien aux éditions Larousse – 2004
 Pharaon, aux éditions Flammarion – 2004
 With Hervé Champollion, L'Égypte : Lettres et journaux du voyage (1828–1829) par Jean-François Champollion, aux éditions de Lodi – 2005
 Le Mastaba d'Akhethetep. Fouilles du Louvre à Saqqara volume  – Peeters – Louvain (Belgique) – mars 2007
 Saqqara – Les Tombeaux de Basse Époque – Peeters – Louvain (Belgique) – prévu pour 2008

References

1942 births
Living people
French Egyptologists
French archaeologists
French women archaeologists
Officiers of the Légion d'honneur
Commanders of the Ordre national du Mérite
Directors of the Louvre
University of Paris alumni
Women museum directors
French women historians